Harischandra is a 1999 Telugu-language romance film directed by Thulasi Kumar and starring J. D. Chakravarthy and Raasi. It was remake of the Tamil film titled Harichandra (1998).

Plot
Harischandra falls in love with Nandini at the first sight. In order to impress her, he lies to her that he does not drink, smoke or even eat non-vegetarian food. Soon he is caught red-handed and she, Nandini forgives him. Now enters another girl in the scene and Nandini assumes that Harishchandra has an affair with the girl. What will happen now?

Cast
 J. D. Chakravarthy as Harischandra "Hari"
 Raasi as Nandini
 Achyuth as Joseph
 Ali
 Uttej
 Sivaji Raja
 Amanchi Venkata Subrahmanyam
 Tanikella Bharani
 Sudha
 Giridhar

Soundtrack 

The soundtrack was composed by Aghosh and all lyrics were written by Sirivennela Seetharama Sastry. All the tunes from the original Tamil film are retained.

References

1999 films
1990s Telugu-language films
Indian romance films
Telugu remakes of Tamil films
1990s romance films